The 1907 Chattanooga Moccasins football team represented the University of Chattanooga—now known as the University of Tennessee at Chattanooga—as an independent during the 1907 college football season. The team finished its six-game schedule without a win, scoring only one touchdown in the entire season. A seventh game was scheduled for Thanksgiving Day, November 28, in Chattanooga against  of Clarksville, Tennessee. However, the game was cancelled on November 27 because of Chattanooga's poor performance on November 26 against the 12th Cavalry.

Schedule

References

Chattanooga
Chattanooga Mocs football seasons
College football winless seasons
Chattanooga Moccasins football